Bunguluke is a locality in Victoria, Australia, located approximately 17 km from Wycheproof, Victoria.

Bunguluke used to be known as Bungeluke. Bungeluke Post Office opened on 18 October 1875 and closed in 1942. A post office was open at Bungeluke North from 1878 until 1895 and from 1902 until 1930.  A Bungeluke Railway Station office opened in 1884 and was renamed Fairview some months later and a Bungeluke West office opened in 1880 became Tyrrell Creek in 1882.

References

Towns in Victoria (Australia)